5 Aquilae (abbreviated 5 Aql) is a quadruple star system in the constellation of Aquila. 5 Aquilae is the Flamsteed designation. The combined apparent visual magnitude of the system is 5.9, which means it is faintly visible to the naked eye.

Two of the components of this system, 5 Aquilae Aa and Ab, are Am stars. That is, they are chemically peculiar stars that show unusual abundances of elements other than hydrogen and helium. The two orbit each other with a period lasting 33.65 years at an eccentricity of 0.33. One of these stars is itself a close spectroscopic binary, with a 4.765 day period and a nearly circular orbit that has an eccentricity of just 0.02. The fourth component, 5 Aquilae B, is a magnitude 7.65 F-type main sequence star with a stellar classification of F3 Vm. It is at an angular separation of 12.71 arcseconds from the other members of the system.

References

External links
 Image 5 Aquilae

Aquila (constellation)
4
Aquilae, 05
173654
092117
7059
Durchmusterung objects
Am stars